The CMA Code of Ethics and Professionalism (Code) is a document produced by the Canadian Medical Association. The Code articulates the ethical and professional commitments and responsibilities of the medical profession in Canada.

History
The CMA Code of Ethics was first published in 1868, and as recently as 2015 was considered by the CMA to be "arguably the most important document produced by the CMA. It has a long and distinguished history of providing ethical guidance to Canada's physicians. Focus areas include decision-making, consent, privacy, confidentiality, research and physician responsibilities. The code is updated every 5-6 years and has a major revision approximately every 20 years. Changes must be approved by CMA General Council."

On 15 October 1996, the CMA Board of Directors approved a document entitled Code of Ethics of the Canadian Medical Association, which contained a Preface, and 43 enumerated points in sections entitled: General Responsibilities; Responsibilities to the Patient; Responsibilities to Society; Responsibilities to the Profession; and Responsibilities to Oneself.

The CMA Code of Ethics was updated in 2004. This document, which was in force at least until March 2015 was composed of four double-column pages and had 54 enumerated points in the section heads identified in 1996.

In November 2017, the new Code document (with a slightly amended title) was in draft form and was noticed by both the Toronto Star and the Simcoe Times in the former's article on cyber-bullying problems at the Ontario Medical Association.

In October 2018, the Code was in draft form. The political position taken by the government of Justin Trudeau to legalize physician assisted suicide in Canada was in question. In the view of some doctors, the withdrawal of the CMA from the World Medical Association (WMA) was due to a conflict over each body's vision of society. Because the CMA supported the legislative change while the WMA found the practice to be repugnant, the president of the CMA, Gigi Osler, manufactured a storm in a teacup in order to withdraw from the WMA.

In December 2018, the Board of Directors issued the Code.

In March 2019, the CPSNL adopted the CMA Code "in accordance with the College's By-Law 5: Code of Ethics".

2018 Synopsis
As of December 2018, the Code document is seven pages long and organized into three alphabetically itemized sections. Section C is by far the longest, and contains 44 numerically itemized paragraphs.

Section A
Section A, entitled VIRTUES EXEMPLIFIED BY THE ETHICAL PHYSICIAN, is a statement concerned with five virtues that the medical profession should strive to embody:
compassion, 
honesty, 
humility, 
integrity and
prudence.

Section B
Section B, entitled FUNDAMENTAL COMMITMENTS OF THE MEDICAL PROFESSION, documents:
Commitment to the well-being of the patient
Commitment to respect for persons
Commitment to professional integrity and competence
Commitment to professional excellence
Commitment to self-care and peer support
Commitment to inquiry and reflection

Section C
Section C describes in subsections,
Patient–physician relationship
Decision-making
Patient privacy and the duty of confidentiality
Managing and minimizing conflicts of interest
and helpfully refers the reader to inter-relationship between: the Physician and him- or herself; the Physician and his or her colleagues; and the Physician and his or her society.

References

Philosophy of medicine
Professional ethics